Laurence Brihaye (September 2, 1969 in Saint-Josse-ten-Noode) is a Belgian rhythmic gymnast.

Brihaye competed for Belgium in the rhythmic gymnastics individual all-around competition at the 1988 Summer Olympics in Seoul. There she tied for 27th place in the preliminary (qualification) round and did not advance to the final.

References

External links 
 
 

1969 births
Living people
Belgian rhythmic gymnasts
Gymnasts at the 1988 Summer Olympics
Olympic gymnasts of Belgium
People from Saint-Josse-ten-Noode
Sportspeople from Brussels